Ziggo Sport is a sports television channel in the Netherlands, operated by Ziggo owned by VodafoneZiggo. It is only available for Ziggo subscribers and broadcasts a variety of sports with a focus on major sporting events, a weekly talk show called "Peptalk", and sports related films and documentaries. It also has a paid counterpart, Ziggo Sport Totaal, which can also be received by non-Ziggo subscribers. The channel started with a repeating promotional film on 2 November 2015 and officially launched on 12 November 2015.

History
In November 2014, Liberty Global took over Dutch cable company Ziggo, including the Sport1 premium sports channels. On 12 November 2015, the Sport1 premium sports channels were rebranded as Ziggo Sport Totaal. During this rebranding, Liberty Global also launched a new Ziggo Sport channel, available for all digital TV subscribers of Ziggo.

Ziggo Sport is available in UHD from March 2021.

In May 2021, Ziggo Sport officially lost the broadcasts rights for Formula One for 2022 and beyond. During 2016 and 2021, the Dutch sports channel attracted a large audience by broadcasting Formula One due to the rise of Formula One driver Max Verstappen.

References

Liberty Global
Vodafone
Television channels in the Netherlands
Television channels and stations established in 2015
2015 establishments in the Netherlands